Devarkulam or Thevarkulam, A (Tamil : தேவர்குளம்) is a Village in Manur taluk, Tirunelveli district, Tamil Nadu State, India. It is situated along State highway 41  (SH-41) between Tirunelveli and Sankarankovil on the Road. This Village is located 38 Kilometre North Side of  Tirunelveli, and South side of Sankarankovil located 27 Kilometre.

Demographics 
According to the 2011 census, the village of Devarkulam had a Population of  4,940 with 2,412 males and 2,528 females. The village had a literacy rate of 69.80%. Child population in the age group below 6 was  239 Males and 237 Females.

References 

Villages in Tirunelveli district
Villages in Tamil Nadu